Suor Emanuelle (Sister Emanuelle) is a 1977 exploitation film. It can be classified under both the nunsploitation and sexploitation exploitation film subgenres. It is part of the long running Black Emanuelle series of films starring Laura Gemser.

Plot 
Renouncing her sinful past Emanuelle (Laura Gemser) moves into a convent and becomes a nun, dedicating her life to religion and rejecting sin. Monika (Mónica Zanchi), a free-spirited daughter of a rich Baron, joins the convent. She tells one sister how she was sexually assaulted by a group of young men; this gains her sympathy from her fellow sisters. Monika has sex and performs various sex acts with various men in and around the convent. Various nuns witness this, causing them to question their faith and break their repression. Monika has a sexual relationship with another sister and blackmails her (by refusing sex) if she does not comply with her demands. Later a mysterious man armed with a gun visits the convent. He has sex with Monika; witnessed by most nuns in the convent. Monika is later dismissed. Emanuelle later leaves of her own free will.

Cast
 Laura Gemser as Emanuelle
 Mónica Zanchi as Monika Catsabriaga 
 Gabriele Tinti as Rene 
 Vinja Locatelli as Anna 
 Pia Velsi as Sister Cecile 
 Patrizia Sacchi as Mother Superior 
 Dirce Funari as Monika's Stepmother
 Rik Battaglia as Catsabriaga

References

External links

Suor Emanuelle at Variety Distribution

1977 films
Italian sexploitation films
Nunsploitation films
Films scored by Stelvio Cipriani
Emanuelle
1970s Italian-language films
1970s Italian films
1970s French films